Leko language may refer to:
the Leco language
one of the Leko languages